Samuel Allegro (born 14 March 1978) is a French former professional footballer who played as a defender.

He signed for then Ligue 2 side Amiens SC in the summer of 2008 from LB Châteauroux.

External links
 
 Samuel Allegro profile at Foot-National.com
 
 

1978 births
Living people
French footballers
Association football defenders
Louhans-Cuiseaux FC players
La Roche VF players
FC Metz players
LB Châteauroux players
Amiens SC players
Red Star F.C. players
Ligue 1 players
Ligue 2 players
Championnat National players